Elections to the Supreme Soviet of the RSFSR were held on 9 February 1947.

References

Russia
Legislative elections in Russia
Supreme Soviet of Russia